Thor Nis Christiansen (28 December 1957 – 30 March 1981) was a Danish-American serial killer and necrophile from Solvang, California. He committed his first three murders in late 1976 and early 1977, killing young women of similar appearance from nearby Isla Vista. His crimes motivated large demonstrations opposed to violence against women, and in favor of better transportation for the young people residing in Isla Vista. In 1979, he killed a young woman from Los Angeles. A fifth intended victim escaped with a bullet in her head, and later identified him in a Los Angeles bar.

Early life
Thor Nis Christiansen was born in Denmark, and emigrated to the United States with his parents when he was five years old. The family initially settled in Inglewood, California, and then moved to Solvang, where his father, Nis, ran a restaurant. Christiansen was a good student until his junior year of high school, when he began neglecting his schoolwork. He moved out of his parents' house, dropped out of school, and began working as a gas station attendant. During this time, Christiansen gained a great deal of weight, at one point weighing 275 pounds (125 kg).

Murders
Christiansen's modus operandi was to pick up hitchhikers, shoot them in the head with a .22 caliber pistol, and sexually assault them post-mortem. His victims had long, straight hair, wore similar clothing, and had about the same build. Accordingly, the killings in Isla Vista were dubbed the "look-alike" murders.

Jacqueline Ann Rook
On January 20, 1979, the body of Jacqueline Rook, 21, was found, shot in the head, in Refugio Canyon near Santa Barbara. She was last seen on November 20, 1976.

Mary Ann Sarris
On May 22, 1977, the remains of Mary Sarris, 19, were discovered in a remote area near Los Alamos Canyon. She had been missing since December 6, 1976.

Patricia Marie Laney
On January 19, 1979, Patricia Laney, 21, was found shot to death, the day after she was reported missing, in Refugio Canyon near Santa Barbara.

Laura Sue Benjamin
On May 26, 1979, the decomposed body of Laura Benjamin, 22, was found in a drainage culvert near Big Tujunga Dam. She was shot twice in the head, sometime in April.

Lydia Preston
On April 18, 1979, Christiansen offered Lydia Preston, 24, a ride. Minutes later, he shot her in the ear. Preston jumped out of the car and made it to the hospital; the bullet was removed and she recovered. On July 11, 1979, Preston spotted Christiansen at a bar in Hollywood. She reported the sighting to police and he was later arrested.

Arrest
On July 27, 1979, after interviewing over 115 persons over the previous two years, Christiansen was arrested for the murders of Patricia Laney, Jacqueline Rook, and Mary Sarris. He was held in a Santa Barbara County jail on $500,000 bond. He caught the attention of investigators in February 1977, when he was cited for being a minor in possession of liquor. The citation noted that Christiansen had a .22 caliber pistol in his car, which was confiscated by the police. However, his arrest came about when Lydia Preston called investigators on July 11, 1979, stating she saw her attacker at a bar in Hollywood.

On August 20, 1979, Christiansen was charged with the murder of Laura Benjamin. The following day, he was charged with the attempted murder of Lydia Preston.

Trial
On December 26, 1979, Christiansen entered a plea of "not guilty by reason of insanity," in addition to his previous "not guilty" plea. He was scheduled to go to trial in Los Angeles on February 4, 1980, for the 1977 murder of Laura Benjamin, and in Santa Barbara on March 17, 1980, for the Isla Vista murders.

Los Angeles Trial
Following a delay, on March 24, 1980, Christiansen withdrew his double plea in favor of a diminished capacity defense. But on April 16, 1980, Christiansen was found guilty of first-degree murder and assault, after a psychiatrist testified that Christiansen displayed some degree of "provisional planning."

During the trial, a psychiatric evaluation of Christiansen revealed he suffered from an "intermittent explosive disorder," a paranoid personality, chronic drug use, and necrophilia. Christiansen also said he killed his victims, took them to a secluded place, unclothed them, and sexually explored their bodies. On May 14, 1980, Christiansen was sentenced to 25 years to life for the murder of Laura Benjamin, and 9 years for the attempted murder of Lydia Preston.

Santa Barbara Trial
To the prosecution's surprise, when the trial began on May 28, 1980, Christiansen pleaded guilty to all three counts of murder. The plea change came just weeks after the Los Angeles trial, where Christiansen was found sane by six out of at least seven psychiatrists. On June 18, 1980, Christiansen was sentenced to life in a maximum security prison.

Death
On March 30, 1981, Christiansen died after being stabbed once in the chest while walking in the exercise yard at Folsom State Prison. His killer was not identified.

Aftermath
Patricia Laney has become a prominent symbol for groups that advocate against violence to women in the Santa Barbara/Goleta/Isla Vista area. She had been a community volunteer with organizations that advocated against violence to women. The Isla Vista Juggling Festival has been held annually in her memory since 1977, and is still active as of 2019.

See also
List of serial killers in the United States
List of unsolved murders

References

Sources
Los Angeles Times: Jan. 20, 1977 p. B26; Jan. 21, 1977 p. 3; Jan. 21, 1977 p. B23; Jan. 26, 1977 p. A3; May 25, 1977 p. B3;Jul. 28, 1979 p. B1; Aug. 21, 1979 p. C8; Sep. 12, 1979, p. B2; Dec. 11, 1979, p. C7;  Feb. 15, 1980, p. B2;  May 15, 1980, p. B25;  Jun. 8, 1980, p. H2;  Mar. 31, 1981, p. C.
Santa Barbara News-Press: Jan. 20, 1977 p. A1; Jan. 21, 1977 p. A1; Jan. 22, 1977 p. A1; Jan. 23, 1977 p. A1; Jan. 24, 1977 p. A1; Jan. 25, 197 p. A1, p. C12; Jul. 27, 1979 p. A1; Jul. 27, 1979 p. A1; Jun. 18, 1980 p. B1; Mar. 31, 1981.
YouTube `The Hitchhiker Slayer'
SB Juggler's
My Favorite Murder Podcast, Episode 27 "Your Hometown Murder Email Round-up" 

1957 births
1976 murders in the United States
1977 murders in the United States
1979 murders in the United States
1981 deaths
1981 murders in the United States
20th-century American criminals
American male criminals
American people convicted of murder
American people who died in prison custody
American prisoners sentenced to life imprisonment
American serial killers
Criminals from California
Criminals from Los Angeles
Danish emigrants to the United States
Deaths by stabbing in California
Male serial killers
Necrophiles
People convicted of murder by California
People from Goleta, California
People from Solvang, California
People murdered in California
Prisoners sentenced to life imprisonment by California
Prisoners who died in California detention
Serial killers murdered in prison custody
Unsolved murders in the United States
Violence against women in the United States